Joseph Bonomo (December 25, 1901 – March 28, 1978) was a famous American weightlifter, strongman, film stunt performer, and actor.

Biography

Bonomo was born to Esther and Albert Bonomo, Sephardic Jewish immigrants from Smyrna, Turkey. His mother emigrated to the United States in 1890 or 1893 and his father in 1894; both lived for a time in France before sailing to their respective emigrations. As a child Bonomo built himself into a strongman, winning the "Mr. Modern Apollo" contest of 1921, for which the prizes included a ten-week movie contract.

He began as a stunt double, soon doubling for Lon Chaney in The Hunchback of Notre Dame and then playing a variety of roles. He lost the role of Tarzan in Tarzan the Mighty when he injured himself before shooting.

Bonomo took interest in dieting and physical culture. His 1954 book Power Plus Cable Course was endorsed by Bernarr Macfadden. In 1951 he authored Calorie Counter and Control Guide, which sold 17 million copies.

Selected filmography

Selected publications

Bonomo Power Plus System of Physical Development (1944)
How To Relax (1943) 
Building Body Power (1950)
Calorie Counter and Control Guide (1951)
Mighty Joe Bonomo's Famous 3-week Speed Course in Super-strength Dynamic Energy, Greater Health (1952)
The Famous Joe Bonomo 'Power-Plus' Cable-Course (1954)
The Scientific & Easy Way to Gain Weight (1958)
The Strongman: Pictorial Autobiography of Joe Bonomo (1968)

References

Bonomo, Joe Strongman: A True Life Pictorial Autobiography of the Hercules of the Screen Kessinger Publishing, 2007.

External links

Joe Bonomo is my Hero

1901 births
1978 deaths
Advertising campaigns
American bodybuilders
American male film actors
American male silent film actors
American stunt performers
American exercise and fitness writers
Strength training writers
American people of Turkish-Jewish descent
American Sephardic Jews
Jewish American sportspeople
20th-century American male actors
Diet food advocates
Male actors from New York City
People associated with physical culture
People from Coney Island
20th-century American non-fiction writers
20th-century American male writers
American male non-fiction writers
20th-century American Jews